Wilfred Lwakatare (born January 4, 1964) is a Tanzanian politician and a member of the Chadema political party. He was elected MP representing Bukoba Urban in 2015.

References 

Living people
1964 births
Members of the National Assembly (Tanzania)
Chadema politicians
Chadema MPs
Tanzanian MPs 2015–2020
Tanzanian Roman Catholics